The 1920 Penn State Nittany Lions football team represented the Pennsylvania State College in the 1920 college football season. Led by third-year head coach Hugo Bezdek, the team played its home games in New Beaver Field in State College, Pennsylvania.

The Lions were undefeated, but were tied in their final two games.

Schedule

References

Penn State
Penn State Nittany Lions football seasons
College football undefeated seasons
Penn State Nittany Lions football